Larry Eugene Carlton (born March 2, 1948) is an American guitarist who built his career as a studio musician in the 1970s and 1980s for acts such as Steely Dan and Joni Mitchell. He has participated in thousands of recording sessions, recorded on hundreds of albums in many genres, including more than 100 gold records, as well as for television and movies. He has been a member of the jazz fusion group the Crusaders, the smooth jazz band Fourplay, and has maintained a long solo career.

Music career

Session work
Carlton was born in Torrance, California, United States, and at the age of six began guitar lessons. His interest in jazz came from hearing guitarist Joe Pass on the radio, after which he moved on to jazz guitarists Barney Kessel and Wes Montgomery, and blues guitarist B.B. King. He went to junior college and Long Beach State College while playing professionally at clubs in Los Angeles.

During the 1970s, he found steady work as a studio musician on electric and acoustic guitar in a variety of genres: pop, jazz pop, rock, rhythm and blues, soul and country. Carlton appeared in hundreds of recording sessions with Steely Dan, Joni Mitchell, Linda Ronstadt, Michael Jackson, Quincy Jones, Bobby Bland, Sammy Davis, Jr., Paulinho Da Costa, Charly García, the Fifth Dimension, Herb Alpert, Christopher Cross, Dolly Parton, Andy Williams, and the Partridge Family. Carlton performed on Mike Post's 1981 "Theme from Hill Street Blues", which won Grammys for 'Best Instrumental Composition' and for 'Best Pop Instrumental Performance'. In 1982, he appeared on The Nightfly by Donald Fagen, lead singer for Steely Dan.

His guitar work on Steely Dan's "Kid Charlemagne" from their 1976 LP The Royal Scam was ranked No. 80 on a list of the best guitar songs by Rolling Stone magazine.

Solo career
Carlton recorded his debut solo album, With a Little Help from My Friends, in 1968. In the mid-1970s he built a home studio and called it Room 335 after the Gibson ES-335, an electric guitar he often played. He has recorded most of his albums at Room 335. In 1988, with his solo career in ascent, he was shot in the throat by a teenager outside Room 335 and suffered nerve and vocal cord damage, which delayed completion of the album he was working on at the time, On Solid Ground. His left arm was paralyzed and for six months he was unable to play more than a few notes.

Carlton produced six albums from 1978 to 1984. His version of "Sleepwalk" by Santo Farina climbed the pop and adult contemporary charts. From 1985 to 1990, he did various solo projects, including the live album Last Nite.

Carlton was commissioned to compose music for the King of Thailand, Bhumibol Adulyadej, in honor of the king's birthday. He recorded The Jazz King (Sony BMG, 2008) with a jazz orchestra that included Tom Scott, Nathan East, and Earl Klugh.

Awards and honors
 Grammy Award for Best Pop Instrumental Performance, "Theme from Hill Street Blues", 1981
 Grammy Award for Best Pop Instrumental Performance, "Minute by Minute", 1987
 Grammy Award for Best Pop Instrumental Album, No Substitutions: Live in Osaka, 2001
 Grammy Award for Best Pop Instrumental Album, Take Your Pick, 2010

Notable instruments
Carlton is best known for his 1969 Gibson ES-335. Other guitars he owns and plays include a 1951 Fender Telecaster, a 1964 Fender Stratocaster, and a 1955 Gibson Les Paul Special. He has used a 1958 Fender Deluxe amplifier, and his standard setup included a Dumble.

He now plays Bludotone amplifiers.
In 2020, Carlton began endorsing Sire Guitars, with whom he has a signature line of electric guitars.

Personal life
Carlton married contemporary Christian music artist Michele Pillar in 1987; they divorced in 2013.

Discography

As leader
 With a Little Help from My Friends (Decca, 1968)
 Singing/Playing (Blue Thumb, 1973)
 Larry Carlton (Warner Bros., 1978)
 Mr. 335 Live in Japan (Warner Bros., 1979)
 Strikes Twice (Warner Bros., 1980)
 Eight Times Up [live] (Warner Bros., 1982)
 Sleepwalk (Warner Bros., 1982)
 Friends (Warner Bros., 1983)
 Alone / But Never Alone (MCA 5689, 1986)
 Last Nite (MCA 5866, 1986)
 Discovery (MCA 42003, 1987)
 On Solid Ground (MCA 6237, 1989)
 Christmas at My House (MCA 6322, 1989)
 Collection (GRP, 1990)
 Kid Gloves (GRP, 1992)
 Renegade Gentleman with Terry McMillan (GRP, 1993)
 Live at the Greek with Stanley Clarke (Epic, 1994)
 Larry & Lee with Lee Ritenour (GRP, 1995)
 The Gift (GRP, 1996)
 Fingerprints (Warner Bros., 2000)
 Deep Into It (Warner Bros., 2001)
 No Substitutions: Live in Osaka with Steve Lukather (Favored Nations, 2001)
 Sapphire Blue (Bluebird, 2003)
 Fire Wire (Bluebird, 2006)
 Live in Tokyo with Robben Ford (335 Records, 2007)
 Greatest Hits Rerecorded, Volume One (335, 2007)
 Take Your Pick with Tak Matsumoto (335, 2010)
 Plays the Sound of Philadelphia (335, 2010)
 New Morning: The Paris Concert (335, 2011)
 Four Hands & a Heart, Volume One (335, 2012)
 Unplugged with Robben Ford (335, 2013)
 Four Hands & a Heart: Christmas (335, 2014)
 At Billboard Live Tokyo with David T. Walker (335, 2015)
 At Blue Note Tokyo with Steve Lukather (335, 2016)
 Lights On [live] with the SWR Big Band (335, 2017)
 Soul Searchin with Paul Brown (Shanachie, 2021)With The Crusaders Crusaders 1 (Blue Thumb, 1972)
 The 2nd Crusade (Blue Thumb, 1973)
 Unsung Heroes (Blue Thumb, 1973)
 Scratch (Blue Thumb, 1974)
 Southern Comfort (Blue Thumb, 1974)
 Chain Reaction (Blue Thumb, 1975)
 Those Southern Knights (Blue Thumb, 1976)
 Free as the Wind (Blue Thumb, 1977)
 The Good and Bad Times (MCA, 1986)
 Happy Again (Sin-Drome, 1995)
 Louisiana Hot Sauce (Sin-Drome, 1996)With Fourplay 4 (Warner Bros., 1998)
 Snowbound (Warner Bros., 1999)
 Yes, Please! (Warner Bros., 2000)
 Heartfelt (Bluebird, 2002)
 Journey (Bluebird, 2004)
 X (Bluebird, 2006)
 Energy (Heads Up, 2008)
 Silver (Heads Up, 2015)

 As sideman With Paul Anka The Painter (United Artists, 1976)
 The Music Man (United Artists, 1977)
 Headlines (RCA Victor, 1979)With Joan Baez Diamonds & Rust (A&M, 1975)
 Speaking of Dreams (Guardian, 1989)With Bobby Bland His California Album (Dunhill, 1973)
 Dreamer (Dunhill, 1974)With David Cassidy Cherish (Bell, 1972)
 Rock Me Baby (Arista, 1972)With Paulinho da Costa Happy People (Pablo, 1979)
 Sunrise (Pablo, 1984) – rec. 1982
 Paulinho Da Costa (Columbia, 1984)With Randy Crawford Everything Must Change (Warner Bros., 1976)
 Nightline (Warner Bros., 1983)With Andraé Crouch Take Me Back (Light, 1975)
 I'll Be Thinking of You (Elektra, 1979)With Four Tops Keeper of the Castle (Dunhill, 1972)
 Main Street People (Dunhill, 1973)
 Meeting of the Minds (Dunhill, 1974)With Michael Franks The Art of Tea (Reprise, 1976)
 Sleeping Gypsy (Warner Bros., 1977)
 Objects of Desire (Warner Bros., 1982)
 Blue Pacific (Reprise, 1990)With David Gates First (Elektra, 1973)
 Goodbye Girl (Elektra, 1978)With Lani Hall Sun Down Lady (A&M, 1972)
 Hello It's Me (A&M, 1974)
 Sweet Bird (A&M, 1976)With Albert Hammond It Never Rains in Souther California (Epic, 1972)
 The Free Electric Band (Mums, 1973)
 Albert Hammond (Mums, 1974)With Hues Corporation Freedom for the Stallion (RCA Victor, 1973)
 Love Corporation (RCA Victor, 1975)With John Klemmer Touch (ABC, 1975)
 Barefoot Ballet (ABC, 1976)
 Hush (Elektra, 1981)
 Music (MCA, 1989)With Bill LaBounty The Right Direction (Noteworthy Records, 1991)
 Back To Your Star (Chill Phill Records, 2009)With Henry Mancini Music from the TV Series the Mancini Generation (RCA Victor, 1972)
 Country Gentleman (RCA Victor, 1974)With Gap Mangione Suite Lady (A&M, 1978)
 Dancin' Is Makin' Love (A&M, 1979)With Megan McDonough In the Megan Manner (RCA, 1972)
 Megan Music (RCA, 1972)
 Keepsake (RCA, 1973)
 Sketches (RCA, 1974)With Joni Mitchell Court and Spark (Asylum, 1974)
 The Hissing of Summer Lawns (Asylum, 1975)
 Hejira (Asylum, 1976)
 Don Juan's Reckless Daughter (Asylum, 1977)
 Wild Things Run Fast (Geffen, 1982)With Wayne Newton Daddy Don't You Walk So Fast (Chelsea, 1972)
 While We're Still Young (Chelsea, 1973)With Michael Omartian White Horse (Dunhill, 1974)
 Adam Again (Myrrh, 1977)
 Mainstream (Sparrow, 1982)With The Partridge Family The Partridge Family Notebook (Bell, 1972)
 Shopping Bag (Bell, 1972)
 Bulletin Board (Bell, 1973)
 Crossword Puzzle (Bell, 1973)With Michele Pillar Look Who Loves You Now (Sparrow, 1984)
 Love Makes All the Difference (Urgent, 1991)
 I Hear Angels Calling (335 Records, 2006)With Johnny Rivers L.A. Reggae (United Artists, 1972)
 Blue Suede Shoes (United Artists, 1973)
 New Lovers and Old Friends (Epic, 1975)
 Wild Night (United Artists, 1976)With Leo Sayer Endless Flight (Chrysalis, 1976)
 Thunder in My Heart (Chrysalis, 1977)With Tom Scott Great Scott! (A&M, 1972)
 Tom Scott and the L.A. Express (A&M, 1974)With James Lee Stanley James Lee Stanley (RCA, 1973)
 Three's the Charm (RCA, 1974)With Steely Dan Katy Lied (ABC, 1975)
 The Royal Scam (ABC, 1976)
 Aja (ABC, 1977)
 Gaucho (MCA, 1980)With Barbra Streisand Stoney End (Columbia, 1971)
 ButterFly (Columbia, 1974)
 Lazy Afternoon (Columbia, 1975)
 Songbird (Columbia, 1978)
 Wet (Columbia, 1979)With Livingston Taylor Man's Best Friend (Epic, 1980)
 Last Alaska Moon (Coconut Bay, 2009)With others'''
 The 5th Dimension, Living Together, Growing Together (Bell, 1973)
 Alessi Brothers, Long Time Friends (Qwest, 1982)
 Herb Alpert, Midnight Sun (A&M, 1992)
 America, Harbor (Warner Bros., 1977)
 Chet Atkins, Stay Tuned (Columbia, 1985)
 Hoyt Axton, Fearless (A&M, 1976)
 Anita Baker, Christmas Fantasy (Blue Note, 2005)
 David Benoit, Letter to Evan (GRP, 1992)
 Stephen Bishop, Careless (ABC, 1976)
 Clint Black, Nothin' but the Taillights (RCA, 1997)
 David Blue, Com'n Back for More (Asylum, 1975)
 Terence Boylan, Suzy (Asylum, 1980)
 The Brothers Johnson, Blam! (A&M Records, 1978)
 Glen Campbell, Bloodline (Capitol, 1976)
 Kim Carnes, Rest on Me (Amos, 1971)
 Vikki Carr, Ms. America (Columbia, 1973)
 Keith Carradine, I'm Easy (Asylum, 1976)
 David Crosby, Oh Yes I Can (A&M, 1989)
 Christopher Cross, Christopher Cross (Warner Bros., 1979)
 Lisa Dal Bello, Lisa Dal Bello (MCA, 1977)
 Patti Dahlstrom, The Way I Am (20th Century, 1973)
 Eumir Deodato, Love Island (Warner Bros., 1978)
 Neil Diamond, Jonathan Livingston Seagull (Columbia, 1973)
 Cass Elliot, Cass Elliot (RCA Victor, 1972)
 Don Ellis, Haiku (MPS, 1974)
 Tommy Emmanuel, Can't Get Enough (Columbia, 1996)
 Eye to Eye, Shakespeare Stole My Baby (Warner Bros., 1983)
 Donald Fagen, The Nightfly (Warner Bros., 1982)
 Peter Frampton, All Blues (Universal, 2019)
 Peter Gabriel, Walk Through the Fire (Virgin, 1984)
 Charly García, Clics modernos (Interdisc, 1983)
 Jerry Garcia, Compliments of Garcia (Warner Bros., 1974)
 Art Garfunkel, Angel Clare  (Columbia, 1973)
 Lesley Gore, Love Me By Name (A&M Records, 1976)
 Carolyn Hester, Carolyn Hester (RCA Victor, 1973)
 Thelma Houston, I've Got the Music in Me (Sheffield, 1975)
 James Ingram, It's Your Night (Qwest, 1983)
 Chuck Jackson, Through All Times (ABC, 1973)
 Michael Jackson, Off the Wall (Epic, 1979)
 Etta James, Deep in the Night (Warner Bros., 1978)
 Al Jarreau, Glow (Reprise, 1976)
 Billy Joel, Piano Man (Columbia, 1973)
 Booker T. Jones, The Runaway (MCA, 1989)
 Marc Jordan, Mannequin Vivid Sound, (Warner Bros., 1978)
 The Keane Brothers, The Keane Brothers (20th Century Records, 1977)
 Abraham Laboriel, Dear Friends (Bluemoon, 1993)
 James Last, Well Kept Secret (Polydor, 1975)
 Peggy Lee, Norma Deloris Egstrom from Jamestown, North Dakota (Capitol, 1972)
 Lori Lieberman, A Piece of Time (Capitol, 1974)
 Jeff Lorber, Private Passion (Warner Bros., 1986)
 Elliot Lurie, Elliot Lurie (Epic, 1975)
 Chuck Mangione, 70 Miles Young (A&M, 1982)
 Ray Manzarek, The Golden Scarab (Mercury, 1974)
 Johnny Mathis, A Special Part of Me (Columbia, 1984)
 Michael McDonald, Motown (Motown, 2003)
 Lonette McKee, Lonette (Sussex, 1974)
 Carmen McRae, Can't Hide Love (Blue Note, 1976)
 Anne Murray, Together (Capitol Records, 1975)
 Teruo Nakamura, Super Friends (Eastworld, 1985)
 Aaron Neville, Warm Your Heart (A&M, 1991)
 Olivia Newton-John, Soul Kiss (MCA Records, 1985)
 Dolly Parton, 9 to 5 and Odd Jobs (RCA Victor, 1980)
 Mike Post, Television Theme Songs (Elektra, 1982)
 Boots Randolph, Boots with Brass (Monument, 1970)
 Lou Rawls, She's Gone (Bell, 1974)
 Gene Redding, Blood Brother Haven (Capitol, 1974)
 Helen Reddy, Helen Reddy (Capitol Records, 1971)
 The Righteous Brothers, Give It to the People (Capitol, 1974)
 Minnie Riperton, Adventures in Paradise (Epic, 1975)
 Austin Roberts, The Last Thing On My Mind (Chelsea, 1973)
 Linda Ronstadt, Don't Cry Now (Asylum, 1973)
 Diana Ross, Ross (RCA Victor, 1983)
 Buffy Sainte-Marie, Sweet America (ABC, 1976)
 Joey Scarbury, America's Greatest Hero (Elektra, 1981)
 Diane Schuur, The Gathering (Vanguard, 2011)
 Seals and Crofts, Get Closer (Warner Bros., 1976)
 Marlena Shaw, Who Is This Bitch, Anyway? (Blue Note, 1975)
 Ben Sidran, The Doctor Is in (Arista, 1977)
 Dan Siegel, Dan Siegel (Elektra, 1982)
 Sonny & Cher, Mama Was a Rock and Roll Singer, Papa Used to Write All Her Songs (MCA, 1973)
 Dusty Springfield, Cameo (Dunhill, 1973)
 Jim Stafford, Not Just Another Pretty Foot (MGM, 1975)
 B. W. Stevenson, Lead Free (RCA, 1972)
 B. W. Stevenson, My Maria (RCA, 1973)
 B. W. Stevenson, Calabasas (RCA, 1974)
 John Stewart, Sunstorm (Warner Bros., 1972)
 Tavares, Hard Core Poetry (Capitol, 1974)
 Cal Tjader, Last Bolero in Berkeley (Fantasy, 1973)
 Allen Toussaint, Motion (Warner Bros., 1978)
 Frankie Valli, Closeup (Private Stock, 1975)
 Townes Van Zandt, High, Low and in Between (Poppy, 1972)
 T-Bone Walker, Very Rare (Reprise, 1973)
 Dionne Warwick, Friends in Love (Arista Records, 1982)
 Tim Weisberg, Hurtwood Edge (A&M, 1972)
 Kirk Whalum, The Promise (Columbia, 1989)
 Vanessa Williams, The Sweetest Days (Mercury, 1994)
 Andy Williams, Andy (Columbia, 1976)
 Lorna Wright, Circle of Love (Rocket Records, 1978)

Video
 1987 Larry Carlton Live 1988 Scrooged 1989 Star Licks Larry Carlton 1992 Star Licks Larry Carlton Vol. 2 1997 Larry Carlton Live at Montreal International Jazz Festival 2002 Ohne Filter (inakustik)
 2002 Live at Montreal Jazz Festival (Eagle)
 2004 Larry Carlton Recorded Live in Paris 2005 Carlton/Lukather Band – The Paris Concert (inakustik)
 2007 Larry Carlton with Robben Ford Live in Osaka (335) - bonus DVD with CD Larry Carlton with Robben Ford Live in Tokyo 2008 Carlton, Ford + Autour Du Blues – The Paris Concert (inakustik)
 2008 Carlton and the Sapphire Blues Band – The Paris Concert (inakustik)
 2009 Carlton Trio – The Paris Concert (inakustik)
 2004 Eric Clapton's Crossroads Guitar Festival''

References

External links
 Official site

1948 births
Living people
Musicians from Torrance, California
Guitarists from California
20th-century American guitarists
21st-century American guitarists
American blues guitarists
American jazz educators
American jazz guitarists
American male guitarists
American pop guitarists
American rock guitarists
American session musicians
American shooting survivors
Grammy Award winners
Jazz fusion guitarists
Lead guitarists
American male jazz musicians
Smooth jazz guitarists
GRP Records artists
MCA Records artists
Uni Records artists
Warner Records artists
The Crusaders members
Fourplay members
L.A. Express members
Favored Nations artists
20th-century American male musicians
21st-century American male musicians
Jazz musicians from California
Blue Thumb Records artists